River Ridge may refer to:

River Ridge, Monroe County, Alabama
River Ridge, Pike County, Alabama
 River Ridge, Florida, USA
 River Ridge, Indiana, USA
 River Ridge, Louisiana, a suburb of New Orleans, USA
 Trinity School at River Ridge, a private school in Bloomington, Minnesota, USA
 River Ridge High School (disambiguation), several schools in the USA
 River Ridge (TV series)